Prince Constantine of Greece may refer to:
Constantine I of Greece
Constantine II of Greece
Prince Constantine Alexios of Greece and Denmark